Ch'angdo County is a kun, or county, in Kangwŏn province, North Korea.  Originally part of Kimhwa, it was split off as a separate county in 1952.

Geography
Ch'angdo lies to the west of the Taebaek Mountains, in the Ryŏngsŏ region of Kangwŏn, but is nonetheless quite rugged. The highest point is Okpatpong (옥밭봉), 1240 m above sea level. Ch'angdo lies just north of the Korean Demilitarized Zone.  The chief stream is the Pukhan River, which flows southward across the DMZ into South Korea.  Roughly 80% of the county's area is forestland.

Administrative divisions
Ch'angdo county is divided into 1 ŭp (town) and 16 ri (villages):

Economy
The chief local industry is agriculture, including sericulture and livestock farming. Lumbermills have also been developed, but there is little other industry. There are deposits of copper, zinc, nickel, and lead.

Transportation
Ch'angdo is connected to the rest of North Korea by road, but not by rail. Google Earth imagery from 2017 shows a newly constructed emergency highway landing strip for aircraft and is equipped with two aircraft parking revetments located to the north of Changdo city.

See also
Geography of North Korea
Administrative divisions of North Korea
Kangwon (North Korea)

References

External links

Counties of Kangwon Province (North Korea)